DHPS is an acronym that can stand for:

Sciences
 Deoxyhypusine synthase, DHPS
 Dihydropteroate synthetase

Organisations
 Deutsche Höhere Privatschule Windhoek